"Sunday Morning" is a song by the Velvet Underground. It is the opening track on their 1967 debut album The Velvet Underground & Nico. It was first released as a single in December 1966. The song is written in the key of F major.

Recording

In late 1966, "Sunday Morning" was the final song to be recorded for The Velvet Underground & Nico. It was requested by Tom Wilson, who thought the album needed another song with lead vocals by Nico with the potential to be a successful single. The final master tape of side one of the album shows "Sunday Morning" only penciled in before "I'm Waiting for the Man".

In November 1966, Wilson brought the band into Mayfair Recording Studios in Manhattan. The song was written with Nico's voice in mind by Lou Reed and John Cale on a Sunday morning. The band previously performed it live with Nico singing lead, but when it came time to record it, Lou Reed sang the lead vocal. Nico would instead sing backing vocals on the song.

Aiming to create a hit for the album, "Sunday Morning" features noticeably more lush and professional production than the rest of the songs on the album. The song's prominent use of celesta was the idea of John Cale, who noticed the instrument in the studio and decided to use it for the song. He also played viola and piano via overdubs and Sterling Morrison, normally the secondary guitarist, played bass, despite his dislike of playing the instrument.

According to Reed, the song's theme was suggested by Andy Warhol. "Andy said, 'Why don't you just make it a song about paranoia?' I thought that was great so I came up with 'Watch out, the world's behind you, there's always someone around you who will call... It's nothing at all' which I feel is the ultimate paranoid statement in that the world cares enough to watch you."

Reception
AllMusic's Mark Deming wrote that the song is "dreamy pop", the only song of that sort on the album.  Cash Box said the single is a "haunting, lyrical emotion stirring chant."

Cover versions
"Sunday Morning" has been covered by various bands, including Rusty, Villagers, Bettie Serveert, Beck, Chris Coco & Nick Cave, Nina Hagen, James, Oh-OK, Elizabeth Cook, NY Loose, the Feelies, Orchestral Manoeuvres in the Dark, the Queers, Strawberry Switchblade, Wally Pleasant, and Matthew Sweet & Susanna Hoffs. Japanese rock duo the Flare, composed of Sugizo and Yuna Katsuki, included a cover on their 2004 single "Uetico". The alternative rock Japanese band the Teenage Kissers made a cover and released it on their first full album Virgin Field. The song has also been covered by Belle & Sebastian during live shows.

In 2009, Northern Irish pop punk/new wave band, The Undertones covered "Sunday Morning" for Onder Invloed, a project by Dutch journalist Matthijs van der Ven which showcases various musicians from all over the world covering their favorite songs.

A cover of the song by the Doug Anthony All Stars was used in a season 1 episode of DAAS Kapital, but did not appear on the DVD set of the sci-fi sitcom due to "contractual reasons... and because we never paid to use it in the first place," according to Paul McDermott.

The chord progression is used in Kramer's "Don't Come Around", which includes the lyric, "I love this song," presumably referring to the Velvet Underground song rather than the Kramer song.

In 2015, the song was covered by Børns and Petite Meller as a duet and was released as a single.

Billy Bragg and Courtney Barnett covered the song on the Australian television live music trivia quiz show, RocKwiz.

In 2016, a version was recorded by Richard Barone for his Sorrows & Promises: Greenwich Village in the 1960s album, as a duet with Jenni Muldaur, who frequently sang background vocals for both Lou Reed and John Cale on their solo work.

In 2017, Phish covered the song on Night 3 of their "Bakers Dozen" run at Madison Square Garden, which was a theme night concert celebrating Red Velvet doughnuts.

Also in 2017, Flo Morrissey and Matthew E. White covered the song on their album Gentlewoman, Ruby Man, a collection of covers.

References

Sources

 

The Velvet Underground songs
1966 singles
Songs written by Lou Reed
Song recordings produced by Tom Wilson (record producer)
Songs written by John Cale
1966 songs
Verve Records singles